Basukinath is a town and notified area in the Dumka, Jharkhand, India.

Geography

Area

Overview
The map shows a large area, which is a plateau with low hills, except in the eastern portion where the Rajmahal hills intrude into this area and the Ramgarh hills are there. The south-western portion is just a rolling upland. The entire area is overwhelmingly rural with only small pockets of urbanisation.

Demographics
According to the 2011 Census of India, Basukinath had a total population of 17,123, of which 8,861  (52%) were males and 8,262 (48%) were females. Population in the age range 0–6 years was 2,701. The total number of literate persons in Basukinath was 14,422 (68.41% of the population over 6 years).

 Indian census, Basukinath has a population of 14,119 (52% men, 48% women). Basukinath has an average literacy rate of 54%, which is lower than the national average of 59.5%; with 62% of men and 38% of women literate. 17% of the population is under 6 years of age.

Infrastructure
According to the District Census Handbook 2011, Dumka, Basukinath covered an area of 17.23 km2. Among the civic amenities, it had 46 km roads with both open and closed drains, the protected water supply involved hand pump, uncovered well. It had 2,094 domestic electric connections, 300 road lighting points. Among the medical facilities, it had 3 hospitals, 2 dispensaries, 2 health centres, 1 family welfare centre, 1 maternity and child welfare centre, 1 nursing home, 4 charitable hospital/ nursing homes, 1 veterinary hospital, 20 medicine shops. Among the educational facilities it had 15 primary schools, 6 middle schools, 2 secondary schools, 2 senior secondary schools, 1 general degree college. It had 1 non-formal education centre (Sarba Shiksha Abhiyan). Among the social, cultural and recreational facilities it had 4 auditorium/ public halls, 1 public library, 1 reading room. Three important items it produced were sweets, iron goods, chira. It had the branch offices of 3 nationalised banks, 1 cooperative bank, 1 agricultural credit society.

Religion
Basukinath serves as a place of pilgrimage for Hindus. Baba Basukinath Temple is the main attraction and situated along the Jasidih Dumka New Railway Line.

Shravan mela

Basukinath is famous for the mela of Shraavana (a month of the Hindu calendar), between July and August. Some pilgrims are called "Bol Bam" when they pour holy water on the shivling after 4–5 days of journeying. The pilgrims en route to Basukinath also visit the Baidyanath Jyotirlinga in Deogarh.

Ram Janki Vivah Utsav
Pandit Nainalal Jha and Pradhan Tirth Purohit Baba Basukinath started the festival of "Ram Janki Vivah Utsav" in Basukinath. A baraat which included elephants and horses participated in the procession as well. In present day the festival has been continued by his son Pandit Tara Kant Jha.

External links

References

Cities and towns in Dumka district